Harold Herbert Helman (August 28, 1894 – April 22, 1971) was a Canadian professional ice hockey right winger who played 3 seasons in the National Hockey League for the Ottawa Senators between 1922 and 1925. He won the Stanley Cup in 1923. He was born in Ottawa, Ontario.

Playing career
Helman played senior hockey for several teams in the Ottawa City Hockey League before joining the Ottawa Senators in 1922. He was a member of the Senators for three seasons, mostly as a substitute. He was a member of the 1923 Senators Stanley Cup winning squad. He was out of professional hockey after the 1924–25 season, but joined the Saskatoon Sheiks for one season in 1926–27.

Career statistics

Regular season and playoffs

References

External links
 

1894 births
1971 deaths
Canadian ice hockey right wingers
Ice hockey people from Ottawa
Ottawa Senators (1917) players
Saskatoon Sheiks players
Stanley Cup champions